The 2004–05 Zurich Premiership was the 18th season of the top flight of the English domestic rugby union competitions.

For the first time, two of the opening games of the season were played at Twickenham, in the 2004 London Double Header, between the four "London" teams: Harlequins, London Irish, London Wasps and Saracens.

At the end of the season, Harlequins were relegated, to be replaced by Bristol for 2005-06.

Participating teams 

Notes

Table

Results

Week 1

Week 2

Week 3

Week 4

Week 5

Week 6

Week 7

Week 8

Week 9

Week 10

Week 11

Week 12

Week 13

Week 14

Week 15

Week 16

Week 17

Week 18

Week 19

Week 20

Week 21

Week 22

Play-offs 
As for the 2003–04 season, the first placed team automatically qualified for the final, where they played the winner of the second vs third place semi-final. This was the last season in which that format of play-off was used.

Semi-final

Final

Zurich Wildcard

Semi finals

Final

Leading scorers
Note: Flags to the left of player names indicate national team as has been defined under World Rugby eligibility rules, or primary nationality for players who have not earned international senior caps. Players may hold one or more non-WR nationalities.

Most points 
Source:

Most tries
Source:

Total Season Attendances

See also
 2004–05 Powergen Cup

References

2003-04
 
England